Henry Stephens Washington (January 15, 1867 – January 7, 1934) was an American geologist.

Biography
Washington was born in Newark, New Jersey on January 15, 1867. He attended Yale University, graduating in 1886, and took his masters there two years later.   He received his Ph.D. at the University of Leipzig in 1893.  He also studied at the American School for Classical Studies in Athens, Greece.  His research included trips to Greece, Asia Minor, Italy, Spain, Brazil and the Hawaiian islands.  By 1920 he was a consulting mining geologist of high reputation.

Works
His works include:
 Chemical Analyses of Igneous Rocks (1903)
 Manual of the Chemical Analysis of Rocks (1904; 2d ed., 1910)
 The Roman Cogmatic Region (1907)

Notes

References
)

External links
Biographical Memoir, National Academy of Sciences

1867 births
1934 deaths
American geologists
Yale University alumni
Leipzig University alumni
People from Newark, New Jersey